Philip Calvert Spensley (7 May 1920 – 22 May 1994) was a British tropical scientist who was director of the Tropical Products Institute, in Chatham, Kent, from 1966 to 1981.

He is buried at St Andrew's church, Totteridge, London.

References 

1920 births
1994 deaths
Scientists from London
Civil servants from London
People educated at St Paul's School, London
Fellows of the Royal Society of Chemistry
Alumni of Keble College, Oxford
St Andrew's church, Totteridge